Elmwood Park Historic District may refer to:

in the United States
Elmwood Park (Syracuse, New York), a historic district listed on the National Register of Historic Places (NRHP) in New York
 Elmwood Park Historic District (Bethlehem, Pennsylvania), listed on the NRHP in Pennsylvania
 Elmwood Park Historic District (Columbia, South Carolina), listed on the NRHP in South Carolina